Burhaniye is a coastal town and district of Balıkesir Province in the Aegean region of Turkey. The district is located on the Aegean coast and is known for its olive oil.
Burhaniye has a port and a museum of archeology. A museum for the Turkish National Movement was inaugurated in 2008 under the name Burhaniye Kuvay-ı Milliye Müzesi. 

A biennial festival, Ören Tourism and Art Festival, is organized in July.

History 

Burhaniye was founded as Taylıeli ('Town of Taylı') village, named after one of the Turkish beys who came to the aid of Seljuk ruler Süleyman. At the beginning of the 14th century it came under the domain of the Karasids and grew as it attracted migrants. In Ottoman times, it was also known as Kemer and attached to Edremit until 1866 and became the centre of a district named after itself. It was renamed Burhaniye after the Ottoman Prince Şehzade Burhanettin. According to the Ottoman General Census of 1881/82-1893, the kaza of Burhaniye had a total population of 19.595, consisting of 17.145 Muslims, 2.433 Greeks, 9 Armenians and 8 foreign citizens.

On 8 June 1922 the town was fell to Turkish forces. As the Greek forces were retreating they intended to burn and destroy the town center, however this was prevented by Borazan Çavuş from Pelitköy, who climbed on a minaret and when he saw the Greek enemy units approaching, played the attack tune on his bugle. He tricked the Greeks into thinking that the town center had a Turkish military presence and thus the Greeks continued their retreat without entering the town center and it was saved from destruction. In front of a statue of Atatürk is a monument with a sculpture of a rifle and bugle in commemoration of Borazan Çavuş and the Kuva-yi Milliye. Until 1992 there was also a sculpture by Gürdal Duyar depicting Borazan Çavuş.

Burhaniye is 4 kilometres east of the site of ancient Adramyttium, which was later moved 13 kilometres northeast to Edremit. Its history is described in the article on the modern town, which has inherited the name of the old.

Twin towns — sister cities

Burhaniye is twinned with:
 Bijelo Polje, Montenegro (2012)
 Hürth, Germany (2011)
 Murfatlar, Romania

Gallery

See also
 Pelitköy
 Borazan İsmail Çavuş

References

External links 

Populated places in Balıkesir Province
Populated coastal places in Turkey
Seaside resorts in Turkey
Aegean Sea port cities and towns in Turkey
Districts of Balıkesir Province